Stars Over Colombo is a 1953 West German adventure film directed by Veit Harlan and starring Kristina Söderbaum, Willy Birgel and Adrian Hoven. It was made in two parts, with a sequel The Prisoner of the Maharaja released in early 1954.

It was shot at the Bavaria Studios in Munich. Location shooting took place in Hamburg and Ceylon.

Cast
 Kristina Söderbaum as Yrida
 Willy Birgel as Maharadscha von Jailapur Gowan
 Adrian Hoven as Gowaran
 René Deltgen as Lakamba
 Rolf von Nauckhoff as Pahana
 Hermann Schomberg as Götz sen.
 Paul Busch as Michael Götz
 Gilbert Houcke as Ambo
 Karl Hermann Martell as Dari
 Herbert Hübner as Zirkusdirektor
 Theodor Loos as Der heilige Mann
 Rolf Wanka as Prosecutor
 Otto Gebühr as Dr. Kuroma
 Sujata Jayawardena as Navarani
 Rudolf Vogel as Yogi
 Werner Lieven as Reishändler
 Veit Harlan as Clown
 Greta Schröder
 Oskar von Schab

References

Bibliography 
 Bock, Hans-Michael & Bergfelder, Tim. The Concise CineGraph. Encyclopedia of German Cinema. Berghahn Books, 2009.

External links 
 

1953 films
West German films
German adventure films
1953 adventure films
1950s German-language films
Films directed by Veit Harlan
Films shot in Sri Lanka
Gloria Film films
Films shot at Bavaria Studios
1950s German films